Stephen Bentil is a Ghanaian professional footballer who plays as a midfielder for Ghanaian Premier League side Ashanti Gold. He previously played for Ebusua Dwarfs from 2016 to 2019.

Career

Ebusua Dwarfs 
Bentil played for Cape coast-based team Ebusua Dwarfs from 2016 to 2019. He was a key member of the squad from his time of joining them till his contract expired in 2019. He played in 56 league matches and scored 9 goals in his 3-year stay with the club. In 2019, after his refusal to extend his contract with Dwarfs after its expiration, he was on the verge of signing for Obuasi-based team Ashanti Gold but the deal fell through.

Ashanti Gold 
In November 2020, he was signed by Ashanti Gold ahead of the 2020–21 Ghana Premier League.

References

External links 

 
 

Living people
Association football midfielders
Ghanaian footballers
Ebusua Dwarfs players
Ashanti Gold SC players
Ghana Premier League players
Year of birth missing (living people)